The Gaoyixi (Gaoyi West) railway station is a high-speed railway station on the Beijing–Guangzhou–Shenzhen–Hong Kong High-Speed Railway located in Gaoyi County, Hebei. It opened with the Beijing-Zhengzhou section of the Beijing-Guangzhou high-speed railway on 26 December 2012.

Station layout
The station has 2 side platforms and 4 tracks.

References

Railway stations in Hebei
Stations on the Shijiazhuang–Wuhan High-Speed Railway
Railway stations in China opened in 2012